Lipí is a municipality and village in České Budějovice District in the South Bohemian Region of the Czech Republic. It has about 700 inhabitants.

Administrative parts
The village of Kaliště u Lipí is an administrative part of Lipí.

References

Villages in České Budějovice District